The LADA Ellada (also known as EL Lada) is the first serial Russian electric car produced by AvtoVAZ. It is built on the LADA Kalina chassis. It was publicly launched in 2011.

References 

2010s cars
Ellada
Subcompact cars
Cars introduced in 2011
Cars of Russia

Production electric cars